Trichodryas esoterica is a species of beetle in the family Dermestidae, the only species in the genus Trichodryas.

References

Dermestidae
Beetles described in 2005